The Union Bank was a bank founded in the year 1828 in British India by Prince Dwarkanath Tagore. The bank was the fourteenth oldest bank in India.

History

Founding 

In 19th century India, Prince Dwarkanath Tagore owned his own trading firm Carr, Tagore and Company. Prince Dwarkanath Tagore desired to separate the financial activities of his firm into a separate banking company. As a result of this, the Union Bank was founded in the year 1828.

The Union Bank was formed by the merger of two other banks: The Commercial Bank and The Calcutta Bank.

Management 

Prince Dwarkanath Tagore was the very first Indian to become a director of an Indian bank. All of the previous Indian banks had European directors and founders.

Prince Dwarkanath Tagore was assisted by his Parsi friend Rustomjee Cowasjee who was a successful businessman in his own right in the 19th century.

Final years 

The bank collapsed in the year 1848. Prince Dwarkanath Tagore eventually died in London and is currently buried in London.

Legacy 

The bank is notable for being the fourteenth oldest bank in India.

The bank's founder, Prince Dwarkanath Tagore is also equally notable for being the very first Indian to start and operate a bank in India.

See also

Indian banking
List of banks in India

References

External links
 Oldest Banks in India
 History of the Bank

Defunct banks of India
Companies based in Kolkata
Banks established in 1828